John Maclean (1851–1928), born John McLean, was a Wesleyan Methodist pastor amongst the Indians of the Canadian Northwest, holding pastorates in various towns of western Canada, including Port Arthur, Ontario July 1892-June 1896.  He was born 30 October 1851 in Kilmarnock, Scotland, then moved to Canada. He died 7 March 1928 at Winnipeg, Manitoba.

He learned the languages and customs of the Indians.  He published: Lone Land lights, (1890); James Evans, Inventor of the Syllabic System of the Cree Language, (1890); The Indians of Canada, (1892); Canadian Savage Folk, (1896); Language and Religion, (1899); Life among the Ojibwa and Cree Indians, (1903); Life of William Black, (1907); Winning the Front Place, (1908).  

He edited the Wesleyan (1902–06) and attained several important offices in his denomination.

References

External links
In Their Own Voices
 
 

1851 births
Canadian Methodist ministers
Canadian non-fiction writers
Linguists from Canada
1928 deaths